Zakayo Malekwa (born February 2, 1951) is a retired track and field athlete from Tanzania, who competed in the men's javelin throw event during his career. He represented his native country at three consecutive Summer Olympics, starting in Moscow, Soviet Union (1980). There he set his best Olympic result by finishing in 16th place in the overall-rankings.

International competitions

References

External links

1951 births
Living people
Tanzanian javelin throwers
Male javelin throwers
Tanzanian male athletes
Olympic athletes of Tanzania
Athletes (track and field) at the 1980 Summer Olympics
Athletes (track and field) at the 1984 Summer Olympics
Athletes (track and field) at the 1988 Summer Olympics
Commonwealth Games bronze medallists for Tanzania
Commonwealth Games medallists in athletics
Athletes (track and field) at the 1978 Commonwealth Games
Athletes (track and field) at the 1982 Commonwealth Games
World Athletics Championships athletes for Tanzania
African Games silver medalists for Tanzania
African Games medalists in athletics (track and field)
Athletes (track and field) at the 1987 All-Africa Games
Medallists at the 1982 Commonwealth Games